"Battery" is a song by American heavy metal band Metallica. It is the first track from their third studio album Master of Puppets.

Background and composition 

The song is composed in the key of Em. It has a similar structure to the opening track of Ride the Lightning ("Fight Fire with Fire") and ...And Justice for All ("Blackened"). The song begins with a clean acoustic guitar introduction before drums and bass come in with distorted guitars playing a more melodic sequence. Then the song cuts into a very fast thrash metal riff which is the base for the rest of the song.

James Hetfield improvised the main riff to the song while relaxing in London.

Lyrical meaning 
The lyrics discuss control of anger over one's behavior. However, the theme of the song is based around the San Francisco thrash scene in the 1980s. The most prominent club played by Metallica was the Old Waldorf located at 444 Battery Street in downtown San Francisco. The lyric "Cannot kill the family, Battery is found in me" is a statement that society doesn't understand the scene, those within it ("the family") will defend it as a show of solidarity against the glam metal scene that was popular in the Los Angeles area. The tone of the song is of familial ties and the positive release of energy through interest of metal.

Reception 
Allmusic's Steve Huey called the songs "Battery" and "Damage, Inc.", "two slices of thrash mayhem".

Rolling Stone's reader's poll placed Battery at number 9 on their 10 Best Metallica Songs list.

Kerrang! ranked the song number 5 on their 20 Greatest Metallica Songs Ranked list, commenting: "Echoing Ride The Lightning's superb Fight Fire With Fire in its medieval-tinged acoustic opening before bombing headlong into a masterclass in lean, taut thrash metal, Battery was the fine-tuned statement of intent from a band ready to make their serrated sound a platinum success."

Revolver magazine hosted a fan poll and "Battery" was ranked number 4 out of "Top 5 Metallica Songs".

Loudwire ranked "Battery" at number 7 in their "Best Metallica Songs" list.

Billboard ranked the song at number 4 on their "Top Ten Greatest Metallica Songs" list.

Performances 
The song was first played live on March 27, 1986 along with songs Welcome Home (Sanitarium) and Damage, Inc.

"Battery" used to be a constant part of the band's live set list, frequently either as the opening or closing song. In some cases it was used as a song before the intermission in concerts. Since 2008, the song has been dropped from most set lists. When played live, the song may stop before the interlude, and James Hetfield asks the crowd "Are you alive?... How does it feel to be alive?" (This can be heard on the live album S&M)

"Battery" has been played live 989 times as of September 2022.

Cover versions 

 This song (along with the entire Master of Puppets album) was covered by Dream Theater as part of their world tour in 2002 and has been released as an official Bootleg recording.
 This song was covered by the band Machine Head for Kerrang!'''s Master of Puppets: Remastered, and is also included as a bonus track on some versions of their album The Blackening.
 The song was also covered by the a cappella metal band Van Canto on their debut album "A Storm to Come".
 On "Animetal Rebirth Heroes", Animetal uses the riff for "Battery" throughout the entire song "Touch" with some changes in between.
 This song was covered by the band Ensiferum for Evil Ultimate Metal Covers No. 55. It was also featured on the single "Tale of Revenge".
 Beatallica a mash-up band that combines Metallica and The Beatles combined Battery with The Ballad of John and Yoko to create The Battery Of Jaymz And Yoko on their Masterful Mystery Tour album.
 Die Krupps covered the song for A Tribute to the Four Horsemen.
 This song was covered by Eric AK (Flotsam & Jetsam), Dave Lombardo, Mike Clark, and Robert Trujillo for Metallic Assault: A Tribute to Metallica. Dave Lombardo would play the song with Metallica on stage when Lars Ulrich missed the 2004 Download Festival, and Robert Trujillo would become a member of Metallica in 2003.
 This song was covered by Prototype for Phantom Lords - A Tribute to Metallica released by Dwell Records in 2002.
 Harp tribute duo Harptallica covered the song's introduction on their album Harptallica: A Tribute.
 Pop-punk band Lagwagon borrows the line "smashing through the boundaries/lunacy has found me" for their song "Raise A Family" found on their 2000 release "Let's Talk About Leftovers."
 Deftones covered the song on the second night of the band's 'One Love For Chi' concerts in 2009 with accompaniment from Dave Lombardo of Slayer on drums, Alexi Laiho of Children of Bodom on guitar, Robert Trujillo of Metallica on bass, Daron Malakian and Shavo Odadjian of System of a Down on guitar and bass respectively, and Greg Puciato of The Dillinger Escape Plan on vocals.
 Sum 41 cover this song on their tour but they normally played the intro of this song.

 In popular culture 
The song appears in the 2011 indie film Hesher''.

Controversy 

On August 13, 2018, a man named Chris Watts murdered his family, and a report on the situation contained about how Watts googled lyrics to Metallica's "Battery" after he had disposed the bodies of his pregnant wife and kids. It stirred up controversy in the media, some reports trying to link the song to the murder.

Personnel 

 James Hetfield – lead vocals, rhythm guitar, acoustic guitar
 Kirk Hammett – lead guitar
 Cliff Burton – bass guitar, backing vocals
 Lars Ulrich – drums

References 

Metallica songs
Songs written by James Hetfield
Songs written by Lars Ulrich
1986 songs